Sci Fi Science: Physics of the Impossible (also called Science of the Impossible) is an American documentary television series on Science Channel which first aired in the United States on December 1, 2009. The series is hosted by  theoretical physicist Michio Kaku and is based on his book Physics of the Impossible. In each episode, Dr. Kaku addresses a technological concept from science fiction and designs his own theoretical version of the technology using currently-known science. He also visits scientists developing technology related to the episode's concept.

Episodes

Season 1 (2009–2010)

Season 2 (2010) 
Around March 22, 2010, Dr. Kaku started filming for the second season of Sci Fi Science, consisting of 12 new episodes. It started broadcasting on September 1, 2010.

References

External links 
 
 

Science education television series
Science Channel original programming
2000s American documentary television series
2010s American documentary television series
2009 American television series debuts
2010 American television series endings